Parviz Bahmani (born 5 May 1956) is an Iranian boxer. He competed in the men's lightweight event at the 1976 Summer Olympics.

References

1956 births
Living people
Iranian male boxers
Olympic boxers of Iran
Boxers at the 1976 Summer Olympics
Place of birth missing (living people)
Lightweight boxers